Formula 1000 (F1000) is an open wheel class of Formula car racing, with professional and amateur series worldwide.  Formula 1000 gets its name from the 1000 cc (1.0 L) super-bike engine used to power a single seat, open wheel race car with fully adjustable wings and suspension. Currently, in the United States, F1000 is run in SCCA under the FA (Formula Atlantic) class (it was previously run as FB class prior to 2020) or under SCCA Pro Racing with the North American Formula 1000 Championship.

Formula 1000 cars are priced at $40,000 to $75,000. SCCA rules also allow conversion of an existing Formula car (e.g., FC) to meet F1000 requirements. A converted older Formula 2000 chassis with a used superbike engine ready-to-race can be found for $25,000 to $45,000. A conversion kit for FC cars can be purchased for between $8,000 and $12,000.

Formula 1000 race cars can reach speeds higher 274 km/h (170 mph) and the brakes and corners beyond 3 Gs of downforce.

Manufacturers 
Manufacturers of Formula 1000 race car conversions are listed below in alphabetical order.  A Formula 1000 conversion involves the modification of an existing formula race car to meet current Formula 1000 rules.  One of the major changes involved in a conversion is replacing the original engine and drive train with a 1000 cc super-bike engine using a chain drive train. Other modifications may include chassis frame changes, suspension changes and the addition of an aerodynamics package consisting of front and rear wings with a floor pan diffuser.

Engines 
All specifications are manufacturer claimed.  Rear wheel horsepower is measured with engine installed in superbike.  Installed in a Formula car, rear wheel horsepower may differ from values below.

Manufacturers
Honda, Kawasaki, Suzuki, Yamaha, Aprilia

Popular Suzuki engines in F1000 competition

Suzuki K7: 2007–2008
 Engine: 	998.6 cc (60.94 cu in), 4-stroke, four-cylinder, liquid-cooled, DOHC, 16-valve, TSCC
 Bore Stroke: 	73.4 mm (2.89 in) x 59.0 mm (2.32 in)	                                                                
 Compression Ratio: 	12.5:1
 Power (crank)	185 hp (138 kW) @ 12,000 rpm	                                                                        
 Fuel System: 	Fuel Injection
 Lubrication: 	Wet Sump or Dry Sump
 Ignition: 	Digital/transistorized
 Transmission: 	6-speed, constant mesh	6-speed, constant mesh, Back-torque limiting clutch

Suzuki K9: 2009–2012
 Engine	999 cc (61.0 cu in), 4-stroke, four-cylinder, liquid-cooled, DOHC, 16-valve, TSCC
 Bore Stroke: 	74.5 mm (2.93 in) x 57.3 mm (2.26 in)
 Compression Ratio 12.8:1
 Power (crank)	191 hp (142 kW) @ 12,000 rpm
 Fuel System: 	Fuel Injection
 Lubrication: 	Wet Sump or Dry Sump
 Ignition: 	Digital/transistorized
 Transmission: 	6-speed sequential, constant mesh	6-speed, constant mesh, Back-torque limiting clutch

Honda engines

Formula 1000 at the SCCA National Championship Runoffs

Defunct editions of F1000
Defunct F1000 Racing Series:

 F1000 Championship (2007-2013) - Was a "membership" championship that did not run its own events. 
 F1000 Pro Series (2009-2013) - Ran events on the West Coast before merging with F1000 Championship to form US Formula 1000 Championship. 
 US Formula 1000 Championship (2013-2016) - Ran events in conjunction with SCCA Majors

See also
Professional Formula 1000 Racing Series 
 Australian Formula 1000
 North American Formula 1000 Championship

References

External links 
 Sports Car Club of America
 SCCA General Competition Rules
 2004 Superbike Comparison (1000cc engines) 
 North American Formula 1000 Championship

1000
Sports Car Club of America